Robert Buck (May 25, 1938–January 22, 1996) was an American sportscaster and sports director. He was the younger brother of St. Louis Cardinals radio broadcaster Jack Buck and was the uncle of national television sportscaster Joe Buck.
Early in his career, Buck was a sportscaster for NBC Radio. He moved to St. Louis, becoming Sports Director for KMOX/KMOV-TV from 1972 to1979 and also served as a sports reporter at the station from 1976 to 1982.

From 1985 to 1996, Buck was Sports Director for WIKY AM/FM radio in Evansville, Indiana, where he also provided play-by-play coverage of University of Evansville basketball, football, soccer, and baseball.

Bob Buck had one daughter (Colleen) and three grandchildren (Robert, Jerry, and Natalie).

References

1938 births
1996 deaths
American sports announcers
Baseball announcers
College basketball announcers in the United States
College football announcers
Los Angeles Rams announcers
People from St. Louis
People from Evansville, Indiana
Radio personalities from Cleveland
Suicides in Indiana
United States Football League announcers
University of Evansville people
1996 suicides